Brandon Joshua Barriera (born March 4, 2004) is an American professional baseball pitcher in the Toronto Blue Jays organization. He is ranked third on Major League Baseball's 2022 Top 30 Blue Jays prospects list.

Amateur career
Barriera was born in Brooklyn, New York and lived there until he and his family moved to Coconut Creek, Florida, when he was six years old. He grew up a New York Yankees fan.

As an amateur, Barriera played for USA Baseball twice, once on their 12U National Team and once on their 15U National Team in Playa del Carmen, Mexico, where he helped lead Team USA to a Gold Medal. He attended American Heritage School in Plantation, Florida. In 2019, he committed to play college baseball at Vanderbilt University. Barriera pitched only 16 innings as a junior in 2021, but did not surrender a run while striking out 26 batters. That summer, he played in the High School All-American Game at Coors Field. Barriera entered his senior season in 2022 as a top prospect for the upcoming draft. He ended his season in mid-April after starting eight games, going 5-0 with a 2.27 ERA and 68 strikeouts over 37 innings. Barriera chose to end his season early in order to avoid injury and to prepare for the draft. In June, he traveled to San Diego where he participated in the Draft Combine.

Professional career
The Toronto Blue Jays selected Barriera in the first round with the 23rd overall selection of the 2022 Major League Baseball draft. He signed with the team for $3.6 million.

References

External links

2004 births
Living people
Baseball players from Florida
Baseball pitchers
United States national baseball team players